Prumnopitys taxifolia, the mataī or black pine, is an endemic New Zealand coniferous tree that grows on the North Island and South Island. It also occurs on Stewart Island/Rakiura (47 °S) but is uncommon there.

It grows up to 40 m high, with a trunk up to 2 m diameter. The leaves are linear to sickle-shaped, 10–15 mm long and 1.5–2 mm broad. The seed cones are highly modified, reduced to a central stem 3–4 cm long bearing 1-6 scales, each scale maturing berry-like, 10–15 mm long, violet-purple with a soft edible pulp covering the single seed. The seeds are dispersed by the New Zealand pigeon (kererū), which eats the 'berries' and passes the seeds in its droppings.

Classification
The scientific name taxifolia derives from the resemblance of the leaves to those of the yew (Taxus). In the past the species, like the other species of Prumnopitys, was often included in Podocarpus; in this species under the name Podocarpus spicatus. It is distinguished from Prumnopitys ferruginea (miro) by the shorter, more slender leaves and the globose violet-purple cones.

Juvenile state
 Unlike the related miro (Prumnopitys ferruginea), mataī has a distinctive and long-lasting juvenile stage. The juvenile is a shrub with a tangle of slender, flexible, divaricating branchlets interspersed with a scattering of brown, pale yellow, or dirty white leaves. After a number of years, the adult tree begins to grow out of the top of the juvenile shrub and then the divaricating branchlets will wither and drop off.

Ecology

Mataī are the host plant for caterpillars of the New Zealand endemic moth species Pyrgotis zygiana. The seeds of this tree also play host to the another endemic moth Heterocrossa iophaea.

Use
The timber of this tree was used extensively in New Zealand for flooring during the mid-20th century. Mataī is not threatened, although as a forest-type it has been greatly reduced through widespread logging. Very few intact examples of mataī-dominated forest remain.

References

External links

Citizen science observations of mataī

taxifolia
Trees of New Zealand
Trees of mild maritime climate
Least concern plants
Divaricating plants
Endemic flora of New Zealand